Order of Culture and Art is an Iranian state general order established by "Council of Iran Ministers" on November 21, 1990 and modified on June 27, 2007. The order has three classes and awarded by President of Iran. According to Article 17 of the Regulations on the Awarding of Government Orders of Iran, the Order of Culture and Art is awarded to those who "facilitate theirs thinking, passions and emotions to express deep Islamic and humanitarian concepts and to spread culture" in one of the following ways:
 Disseminating rich Islamic culture and eliminating society from foreign decadent culture
 Expanding the theoretical and disciplinary foundations of religious education
 Expanding national culture and revitalizing valuable social traditions
 Expressing creativity and presenting exquisite works of art or literature
 Pay particular attention to the country's cultural, artistic or literary heritage, so as to be effective in its restoration, preservation and utilization
 Introducing, describing, explaining, critiquing and presenting one of the artistic or literary disciplines internationally
 Inventing a new style in one of the artistic or literary disciplines
 Promote a culture of sacrifice and martyrdom in the community
 Creating remarkable and valuable artworks to convey the ideals and values of the Islamic Revolution and the Sacred Defense to future generations

Recipients

Classes 
It comes in three classes:

See also 
 Order of Merit and Management
 Order of Freedom (Iran)
 Order of Altruism
 Order of Work and Production
 Order of Research
 Order of Mehr
 Order of Justice (Iran)
 Order of Construction
 Order of Knowledge
 Order of Education and Pedagogy
 Order of Persian Politeness
 Order of Independence (Iran)
 Order of Service
 Order of Courage (Iran)

References

External links 
 Iran Awarding of Government Orders website
 Types of Iran's Orders and their benefits (Persian)

CS1 uses Persian-language script (fa)
Awards established in 1990
Civil awards and decorations of Iran
1990 establishments in Iran